Moonlight Becomes You is the 41st studio album by country singer Willie Nelson.  The title track was nominated for a Grammy.

Track listing
"December Day" (Willie Nelson) - 2:19
"Moonlight Becomes You" (Johnny Burke, Jimmy Van Heusen) - 3:51
"Afraid" (Fred Rose) - 2:35
"The Heart of a Clown" (Steve Nelson, Jack Rollins, Francis Kane) - 3:45
"Please Don't Talk About Me When I'm Gone" (Sidney Clare, Sam Stept) - 2:05
"Everywhere You Go" (Larry Shay, Mark Fisher, Joe Goodwin) - 3:35
"Have I Stayed Away Too Long" (Frank Loesser) - 4:07
"Sentimental Journey" (Bud Green, Les Brown, Ben Homer) - 3:14
"The World Is Waiting for the Sunrise" (Gene Lockhart, Ernest Seitz) - 2:20
"You'll Never Know" (Mack Gordon, Harry Warren) - 3:14
"I'll Keep On Loving You" (Floyd Tillman) - 2:49
"You Just Can't Play a Sad Song on a Banjo" (Paul Buskirk, Russell Jackson) - 2:03
"You Always Hurt the One You Love" (Doris Fisher, Allan Roberts) - 2:27
"Someday (You'll Want Me to Want You)" (Jimmie Hodges) - 3:29
"In God's Eyes" (Willie Nelson) - 2:58

Personnel
Willie Nelson - guitar, vocals
Paul Buskirk - guitar, mandola
Johnny Gimble - fiddle, vocals, harmony vocals
Mike Lefebvre - drums
Dean Reynolds - bass guitar
Paul Schmitt - piano

Chart performance

References

1994 albums
Willie Nelson albums
Traditional pop albums